Grand Marais may refer to:

 Grand Marais, Louisiana, a Creole unincorporated community in Iberia Parish, Louisiana, United States
 Grand Marais, Manitoba, Canada
 Grand Marais, Michigan, United States
 Grand Marais, Minnesota, United States
 Grand Marais, Seeland, Switzerland
 Grand Marais Creek, a 41.1-mile-long (66.1 km) tributary of the Red River of the North in northwestern Minnesota, United States
 Grand Marais Road (Windsor, Ontario), a road that travels through Windsor, Ontario
 Grand Marais Trail, a small bicycle trail that follows Turkey Creek in the middle of Windsor, Ontario

See also
 Grand (disambiguation)
 Marais (disambiguation)
 Little Marais (disambiguation)